The Upper Silesia plebiscite was a plebiscite mandated by the Versailles Treaty and carried out on 20 March 1921 to determine ownership of the province of Upper Silesia between Weimar Germany and Poland. The region was ethnically mixed with both Germans and Poles; according to prewar statistics, ethnic Poles formed 60 percent of the population. Under the previous rule by the German Empire, Poles claimed they had faced discrimination, making them effectively second class citizens. The period of the plebiscite campaign and inter-Allied occupation was marked by violence. There were three Polish uprisings, and German volunteer paramilitary units came to the region as well.

The area was policed by French, British, and Italian troops, and overseen by an Inter-Allied Commission. The Allies planned a partition of the region, but a Polish insurgency took control of over half the area. The Germans responded with volunteer paramilitary units from all over Germany, which fought the Polish units. In the end, after renewed Allied military intervention, the final position of the opposing forces became, roughly, the new border. The decision was handed over to the League of Nations, which confirmed this border, and Poland received roughly one third of the plebiscite zone by area, including the greater part of the industrial region.

After the referendum, on 20 October 1921, a conference of ambassadors in Paris decided to divide the region. Consequently, the German-Polish Accord on East Silesia (Geneva Convention), a minority treaty, was concluded on 15 May 1922 which dealt with the constitutional and legal future of Upper Silesia that had partly become Polish territory.

Ethnolinguistic structure before the plebiscite 
The earliest exact census figures on ethnolinguistic or national structure (Nationalverschiedenheit) of the Prussian part of Upper Silesia, come from 1819. Polish immigration from Galicia, Congress Poland and Prussian provinces into Upper Silesia during the 19th century was a major factor in their increasing numbers. The last Prussian general census figures available are from 1910 (if not including the 1911 census of school children - Sprachzählung unter den Schulkindern - which revealed a higher percent of Polish-speakers among school children than the 1910 census among the general populace). Figures (Table 1.) show that large demographic changes took place between 1819 and 1910, with the region's total population quadrupling, the percent of Germans increasing significantly, while Polish-speakers maintained their steady increasing numbers. Also the total land area in which Polish was spoken, as well as the land area in which it was spoken, declined between 1790 and 1890. Polish authors before 1918 estimated the number of Poles in Prussian Upper Silesia as slightly higher than according to official German censuses.
The three western districts of Falkenberg (Niemodlin), Grottkau (Grodków) and Neisse (Nysa), though part of Regierungsbezirk Oppeln, were not included in the plebiscite area, as they were almost entirely populated by Germans.

The plebiscite 

The Paris Peace Conference at the end of World War I placed some formerly German territory in neighboring countries, some of which had not existed at the beginning of the war. In the case of the new Polish state, the Treaty of Versailles established some 54,000 square kilometers of formerly German territory as part of newly independent Poland. Many of these areas were ethnically mixed. In three of these ethnically mixed areas on the new German-Polish border, however, the Allied leaders provided for border plebiscites or referendums. The areas would be occupied by Allied forces and governed in some degree by Allied commissions. The most significant of these plebiscites was the one in Upper Silesia, since the region was a principal industrial center. The most important economic asset was the enormous coal-mining industry and its ancillary businesses, but the area yielded iron, zinc, and lead as well. The "Industrial Triangle" on the eastern side of the plebiscite zone—between the cities of Beuthen (Bytom), Kattowitz (Katowice), and Gleiwitz (Gliwice) was the heart of this large industrial complex. The Upper Silesia plebiscite was therefore a plebiscite for self-determination of Upper Silesia required by the Treaty of Versailles. Both Germany and Poland valued this region not only for reasons of national feeling, but for its economic importance as well.

The area was occupied by British, French, and Italian forces, and an Interallied Committee headed by a French general, Henri Le Rond. The plebiscite was set for 20 March 1921. Both Poles and Germans were allowed to organize campaigns. Each side developed secret paramilitary forces—both financed from the opposing capitals, Warsaw and Berlin. The major figure of the campaign was Wojciech Korfanty, a pro-Polish politician.

The Poles carried out two uprisings during the campaign, in August 1919 and August 1920. The Allies restored order in each case, but the Polish insurrectionists clashed with German "volunteers," the Freikorps.

A feature of the plebiscite campaign was the growing prominence of a strong autonomist movement, the most visible branch of which was the Bund der Oberschlesier/Związek Górnoślązaków. This organization attempted to gain promises of autonomy from both states and possible future independence for Upper Silesia.

There were 1,186,758 votes cast in an area inhabited by 2,073,663 people. It resulted in 717,122 votes being cast for Germany and 483,514 for Poland. The towns and most of the villages in the plebiscite territory gave German majorities. However, the districts of Pless (Pszczyna) and Rybnik in the southeast, as well as Tarnowitz (Tarnowskie Góry) in the east and Tost-Gleiwitz (Gliwice) in the interior showed considerable Polish majorities, while in Lublinitz (Lubliniec) and Groß Strehlitz (Strzelce Opolskie) the votes cast on either side were practically equal. All the districts of the industrial zone in a narrower sense - Beuthen (Bytom), Hindenburg (Zabrze), Kattowitz (Katowice), and Königshütte (Chorzów) - had slight German majorities, though in Beuthen and Kattowitz this was due entirely to the town vote (four-fifths in Kattowitz compared to an overall 60%). Many country communes of Upper Silesia had given Polish majorities. Overall, however, the
Germans won the vote by a measure of 59.4% to 40.6%. The Interallied Commission deliberated, but the British proposed a more easterly border than the French, which would have given much less of the Industrial Triangle to Poland. 

In late April 1921, when pro-Polish forces began to fear that the region would be partitioned according to the British plan, elements on the Polish side announced a popular uprising. Korfanty was the leading figure of the uprising, but he had much support in Upper Silesia as well as support from the Polish government in Warsaw. Korfanty called for a popular armed uprising whose aim was to maximize the territory Poland would receive in the partition. German volunteers rushed to meet this uprising, and fighting on a large scale took place in the late spring and early summer of 1921. Germanophone spokesmen and German officials complained that the French units of the Upper Silesian army of occupation were favoring the insurrection by refusing to put down their violent activities or restore order.

Twelve days after the start of the uprising, Wojciech Korfanty offered to take his Upper Silesian forces behind a line of demarcation, on condition that the released territory would not be occupied by German forces, but by Allied troops. On 1 July 1921 British troops returned to Upper Silesia to help French forces occupy this area. Simultaneously with these events, the Interallied Commission pronounced a general amnesty for the illegal actions committed during the recent violence, with the exception of acts of revenge and cruelty. The German defense force was finally withdrawn.

Because the Allied Supreme Council was unable to come to an agreement on the partition of the Upper Silesian territory on the basis of the confusing plebiscite results, a solution was found by turning the question over to the Council of the League of Nations. Agreements between the Germans and Poles in Upper Silesia and appeals issued by both sides, as well as the dispatch of six battalions of Allied troops and the disbandment of the local guards, contributed markedly to the pacification of the district. On the basis of the reports of a League commission and those of its experts, the Council awarded the greater part of the Upper Silesian industrial district to Poland. Poland obtained almost exactly half of the 1,950,000 inhabitants, viz., 965,000, but not quite a third of the territory, i.e., only 3,214.26 km2 (1,255 mi2) out of 10,950.89 km2 (4,265 mi2) but more than 80% of the heavy industry of the region.

The German and Polish governments, under a League of Nations recommendation, agreed to enforce protections of minority interests that would last for 15 years. Special measures were threatened in case either of the two states should refuse to participate in the drawing up of such regulations, or to accept them subsequently. In the event, the German minority remaining on the Polish side of the border suffered considerable discrimination in the subsequent decades.

The Polish Government, convinced by the economic and political power of the region and by the autonomist movement of the plebiscite campaign, decided to give Upper Silesia considerable autonomy with a Silesian Parliament as a constituency and the Silesian Voivodship Council as the executive body. On the German side the new Prussian province of Upper Silesia (Oberschlesien) with regional government in Oppeln was formed, likewise with special autonomy.

Results 

According to Article 88 of the Treaty of Versailles all inhabitants of the plebiscite district older than 20 years of age and those who had "been expelled by the German authorities and have not retained their domicile there" were entitled to return to vote.

This stipulation of the Treaty of Versailles allowed the participation of thousands of Upper Silesian migrant workers from western Germany (Ruhrpolen). Hugo Service regards the transport of these eligible voters to Silesia, organized by German authorities, "a cynical act aimed at boosting the German vote", in his opinion it was one of the reasons for the overall result. As Service writes, despite the fact that almost 60% of Upper Silesians voted for their region to remain part of Germany it would be dubious to claim that most of them were ethnically German or regarded themselves as Germans. Voting for Germany in the 1921 vote and regarding oneself as German were two different things. People had diverse, often very pragmatic reasons for voting for Germany, which usually had little to do with a person regarding him or herself as having a German ethnonational identity.

According to Robert Machray, 192,408 of all plebiscite voters were migrants, making up 16 % of the total electorate. Among them, 94.7% voted for Germany. There were cases of votes being cast in the name of already deceased persons who died outside of Upper Silesia, and since their deaths were registered" in comparatively inaccessible German registration departments in Central Germany", it was often difficult to detect voter fraud. Additionally, "the general conditions in which the plebiscite was held by no means created an atmosphere for a free and independent vote" - the administration was staffed by ethnic Germans only, and no Polish schools were allowed, limiting Polish cultural life to churches and private organisations. The Polish population of Silesia overwhelmingly consisted of poor workers and small farmers, who owned no real property and were highly dependent on the German authorities to provide appropiate instrastructure. All offices and every industry was controlled by the German population, who exerted an overwhelming pressure on Poles to vote for Germany, and they "frequently exceeded their lawful powers and supported many forms of anti-Polish activities". 

Demobilised German officers joined the Freikorps and terrorised the Polish population,; Machray states that "Upper Silesia was the scene of incessant confusion, sanguinary struggles with armed German attacks on Polish meetings and on the terrorized and defenceless Polish population, especially in the rural areas." Emil Julius Gumbel investigated and condemned the cases of widespread intimidation and murders by Freikorps and Selbstschutz divisions, remarking: “a denunciation, a suspicion without foundation under the given circumstances, was sufficient. The man concerned is fetched from his lodgings and instantly shot ... all this only because the man was a Pole or was considered a Pole and worked for union with Poland.” Machray establishes that many Poles were either prevented from voting or were intimidated into voting for Germany, noting that in provinces such as Kozle and Olesno, a minority of voters voted for Poland, despite the fact that these areas were overwhelmingly Polish according to the 1910 census, with Poles making up 75% of the Kozle and 80.7% of the Olesno provinces, respectively. Machray concludes that given the aggressive anti-Polish campaign conducted by local authorities and German volunters, "the results were far from being an objective reflection of the true desires of the oppressed people". The constant ethnic tensions and attacks on Polish voters resulted in the Silesian Uprisings.

Comparison of district demographics with voting behavior 
The following table compares the percentage of German speakers (excluding bilinguals) as reported in the 1910 census in each district, with the pro-German vote share registered in the respective district. In almost all districts, the percentage of pro-German votes exceeded the percentage of those who identified as German by almost 25% on average, suggesting that many non-Germans voted in favour of Germany.

The above-mentioned population percentages refer to the entire area of the respective districts, however in a few cases, only parts of a district were included in the plebiscite area:

1 Only a small part of the Namslau district was part of the plebiscite area; 1905 census data was used for this district

2 The predominantly German south-western part of the Neustadt district (including the town of Neustadt) was not part of the plebiscite area

3 The southern part of the Ratibor district (Hlučín Region) was ceded to Czechoslovakia in 1919 and hence was not included in the plebiscite area

Settlements that voted to secede for Poland
In the 1921 plebiscite, 40.6% of eligible voters decided to secede from Germany and become Polish citizens. In total over seven hundred towns and villages voted in majority to secede from Germany and become part of Poland, especially in the rural districts of Pszczyna, Rybnik, Tarnowskie Góry, Toszek-Gliwice, Strzelce Opolskie, Bytom, Katowice, Lubliniec, Zabrze, Racibórz, Olesno, Koźle and Opole.

Division of the region after the plebiscite

See also

Territorial changes of Germany after World War I
Territorial changes of Poland after World War I
1920 Schleswig plebiscites
1920 East Prussian plebiscite

Notes

References

Further reading
 Campbell, F. Gregory Campbell,  "The Struggle for Upper Silesia, 1919-1922." Journal of Modern History 42.3 (1970): 361–385. online
 Rodriguez, Allison Ann. "Silesia at the Crossroads: Defining Germans and Poles in Upper Silesia During the First World War and Plebiscite Period" (PhD Diss. The University of North Carolina at Chapel Hill, 2020) online.
 Tooley, T. Hunt. "German political violence and the border plebiscite in Upper Silesia, 1919–1921." Central European History 21.1 (1988): 56–98.
 Tooley, T. Hunt. National Identity and Weimar Germany: Upper Silesia and the Eastern Border, 1918-1922. (University of Nebraska Press, 1997).
 Walters, F. P. A History of the League of Nations (Oxford University Press, 1952). online
 Wilson, T. K. Frontiers of Violence: Conflict and Identity in Ulster and Upper Silesia 1918-1922 (Oxford University Press, 2010).
Czesław Madajczyk, Tadeusz Jędruszczak, Plebiscyt i trzecie powstanie śląskie ("Plebiscite and Third Silesian Uprising") [in:] Historia Polski ("History of Poland"), Vol.IV, part 1, PAN, Warszawa 1984 
Kazimierz Popiołek, Historia Śląska od pradziejów do 1945 roku ("History of Poland since prehistory until 1945"), Śląski Inst. Naukowy (Silesian Science Institute) 1984

External links
Wojciech Korfanty's proclamation after plebiscite
Exact plebiscite results - according to villages and districts (in German)
1920 map showing German territory's changes, including marked area for the Upper Silesia plebiscite
Map of interwar Poland; shows plebiscite areas
Map of interwar Poland; shows plebiscite areas (in color, Polish)

Border polls
1921 referendums
Referendums in Germany
Referendums in Poland
Aftermath of World War I in Germany
1921 in Poland
Politics of the Weimar Republic
Germany–Poland relations
Silesian Uprisings
1921 in international relations
March 1921 events